Giorgio Pressburger (April 21, 1937 – October 5, 2017) was an Italian writer of novels and short stories.

Born in Budapest, and saved by Giorgio Perlasca during the second world war, Pressburger settled in Italy in 1956, where he worked as a film and theatre director. He later became the Director of the Institute of Italian Culture in Hungary. His book The Law of White Spaces was shortlisted for the Independent Foreign Fiction Award in 1992. His other works include the novel Teeth and Spies and the short story collection Snow and Guilt.

Notes

1937 births
2017 deaths
20th-century Italian novelists
20th-century Italian male writers
Italian male short story writers
Writers from Budapest
Italian people of Hungarian descent
Viareggio Prize winners
Accademia Nazionale di Arte Drammatica Silvio D'Amico alumni
Italian male novelists
20th-century Italian short story writers